Louisa Hawton (born 9 March 1985) is an Australian professional boxer. She has held the WBC interim female atomweight title since 2019 and previously the WBO female junior-flyweight title in 2016. As of May 2020, she is ranked as the world's eighth best active female atomweight by BoxRec.

Professional boxing record

Personal life
Hawton has two children and is now based in the USA.

References

External links
 
 

1985 births
Living people
Sportspeople from Fremantle
Australian women boxers
World light-flyweight boxing champions
Atomweight boxers
Sportswomen from Western Australia
World Boxing Organization champions
20th-century Australian women
21st-century Australian women